Narasingapalli railway station (station code:NASP), is an Indian Railways station in Narasingapalli, a village in Visakhapatnam district of Andhra Pradesh. It lies on the Vijayawada–Chennai section and is administered under Vijayawada railway division of South Central Railway zone.

History 
Between 1893 and 1896,  of the East Coast State Railway, between Vijayawada and Cuttack was opened for traffic. The southern part of the East Coast State Railway (from Waltair to Vijayawada) was taken over by Madras Railway in 1901.

Classification 
Narasingapalli railway station is categorized as a Non-Suburban Grade-6 (NSG-6) station in the Vijayawada railway division.

References

External links 

Railway stations in Visakhapatnam district
Vijayawada railway division